Velars are consonants articulated with the back part of the tongue (the dorsum) against the soft palate, the back part of the roof of the mouth (also known as the “velum”).

Since the velar region of the roof of the mouth is relatively extensive and the movements of the dorsum
are not very precise, velars easily undergo assimilation, shifting their articulation back or to the front
depending on the quality of adjacent vowels. They often become automatically fronted, that is partly or completely palatal before a following front vowel, and retracted, that is partly or completely uvular before back vowels.

Palatalised velars (like English  in keen or cube) are sometimes referred to as palatovelars.
This distinction disappears with the approximant consonant  since labialization involves adding of a labial approximant articulation to a sound, and this ambiguous situation is often called labiovelar.

A velar trill or tap is not possible according to the International Phonetics Association: see the shaded boxes on the table of pulmonic consonants. In the velar position, the tongue has an extremely restricted ability to carry out the type of motion associated with trills or taps, and the body of the tongue has no freedom to move quickly enough to produce a velar trill or flap.

Examples
The velar consonants identified by the International Phonetic Alphabet are:

Lack of velars
The velar consonant  is the most common consonant in human languages. The only languages recorded to lack velars (and any dorsal consonant at all) may be Xavante, Tahitian, and (phonologically but not phonetically) several Skou languages (Wutung, a dialect of Vanimo, and Bobe). In Pirahã, men may lack the only velar consonant. 

Other languages lack simple velars. An areal feature of the indigenous languages of the Americas of the coastal regions of the Pacific Northwest is that historical *k was palatalized. Likewise, historical *k’ has become  and historical *x has become ; there was no *g or *ŋ. In both regions the languages retain a labialized velar series (e.g.  in the Pacific Northwest) as well as uvular consonants. In the languages of those families that retain plain velars, both the plain and labialized velars are pre-velar, perhaps to make them more distinct from the uvulars which may be post-velar. Prevelar consonants are susceptible to palatalization.

Of course, there can be no phoneme  in a language that lacks voiced stops, like Mandarin Chinese, but it is sporadically missing elsewhere. Of the languages surveyed in the World Atlas of Language Structures, about 10% of languages that otherwise have  are missing .

However, the  does not behave as other consonants, and the argument has been made that it is phonemically , leaving Pirahã with only  as an underlyingly velar consonant.

Several Khoisan languages have limited numbers or distributions of pulmonic velar consonants. (Their click consonants are articulated in the uvular or possibly velar region, but that occlusion is part of the airstream mechanism rather than the place of articulation of the consonant.) Khoekhoe, for example, does not allow velars in medial or final position, but in Juǀ'hoan velars are rare even in initial position.

consonants
Normal velar consonants are dorso-velar: The dorsum (body) of the tongue rises to contact the velum (soft palate) of the roof of the mouth. In disordered speech there are also velo-dorsal stops, with the opposite articulation: The velum lowers to contact the tongue, which remains static. In the extensions to the IPA for disordered speech, these are transcribed by reversing the IPA letter for a velar consonant, e.g.  ⟨⟩ for a voiceless velodorsal stop,  ⟨⟩ for voiced, and  ⟨⟩ for nasal.

See also
 Velarization
 Place of articulation
 List of phonetics topics

Notes

References

Further reading

Place of articulation